The men's discus throw at the 2019 World Athletics Championships was held at the Khalifa International Stadium in Doha from 28 to 30 September 2019.

Summary
Coming in to these championships, Daniel Ståhl dominated the season both with the best throw and the best group of throws.  A full metre behind him was Fedrick Dacres and Lukas Weißhaidinger was a further two and a half metres behind him.  That form held true in the qualifying round as Ståhl was the only automatic qualifier.

As the first thrower, Ståhl set the early standard with a 66.59m.  Near the end of the round, Weißhaidinger answered with a 66.74m to take the first round lead.  Starting the second round, Ståhl answered back with a 67.18m.  Three throws later, Dacres joined the battle with a 66.94m, but that would turn out to be his best of the day.  Three throws later Apostolos Parellis joined the 66 metre crowd for the first time adding 63 cm to his national record.  The third round saw Ståhl lead off with the winner .  Later Weißhaidinger improved his standing to 66.82m.  And the last thrower Alin Firfirică displaced Parellis with a 66.46m.  With three more rounds in the competition, none of the leaders would improve their position.   The podium matched the three world leaders.

Records
Before the competition records were as follows:

Qualification standard
The standard to qualify automatically for entry was 65.00 m.

Schedule
The event schedule, in local time (UTC+3), was as follows:

Results

Qualification
Qualification: Qualifying Performance 65.60 (Q) or at least 12 best performers (q) advanced to the final.

Final
The final was started on 30 September at 21:15.

References

Discus throw
Discus throw at the World Athletics Championships